James Alfred Lee (10 December 1891 – 1948) was an English professional footballer who played as a full-back.

Born in Rotherham, Yorkshire, Lee started his career at Rotherham County before moving to Grimsby Town. He transferred to West Ham United for the 1919–20 season. The club had just been promoted to the Football League for the first time and he participated in their opening day fixture against Lincoln City. He was used mainly as a backup to regular full-backs Billy Cope and Frank Burton, but made 26 Second Division appearances while with the club. His final games came in January 1922 against Swansea Town in the FA Cup. He ended his career with Newport County, playing four  matches in the 1922–23 season.

Notes

References

External links
Alf Lee at westhamstats.info

1891 births
1948 deaths
Footballers from Rotherham
English footballers
Association football fullbacks
Rotherham County F.C. players
Grimsby Town F.C. players
West Ham United F.C. players
Newport County A.F.C. players
English Football League players
Place of death missing